Hardy LeBel Jr. (most often credited as simply Hardy LeBel) (born August 4, 1967) is an American professional in the video games industry with a variety of published credits on video game titles including game designer, creative director and creative consultant.

Early life
He was born on August 4, 1967 at the United States Airforce base Tachikawa Airfield in Tachikawa, Tokyo, Japan, and is the only surviving child of Hardy LeBel Sr. (deceased) and Joan LeBel.

Hardy LeBel Jr. graduated from High School at Providence Country Day School and also attended Boston University where he studied acting for a time, but ultimately earned his bachelor's degree in English studies. He currently resides in the Pacific Northwest with his family.

Career
LeBel's video game design credits include titles such as Pac Man World, Halo: Combat Evolved and Halo 2.

Games credited as game designer:
 Halo: Combat Evolved (2001), Microsoft Game Studios
 Oni (2001), Take-Two Interactive Software, Inc.
 Pac-Man World (1999), Namco Limited
 Vigilante 8 (1998), Activision, Inc.
Games credited as creative director or Design Director:
 SOCOM 3: U.S. Navy SEALs (2005), SCEA
 SOCOM: U.S. Navy SEALs - Fireteam Bravo (2005), Sony Computer Entertainment America, Inc.
 Dungeon Siege II (2005), Microsoft Game Studios
 Sudeki (2004), Microsoft Game Studios
Games credited as creative consultant:
 Halo 2 (2004), Microsoft Game Studios
 Interstate '76: Nitro Riders (1998), Activision, Inc.
 Interstate '76 (1997), Activision, Inc.
 Far Cry 2 (2008), Ubisoft Entertainment.
Games credited as voice-over actor:
 Dark Reign: The Future of War (1997), Activision, Inc.

References

Video game designers
Living people
1967 births
People from Tachikawa
Creative directors